Jürgens is a German surname. Notable people with the surname include:

Andrea Jürgens (1967–2017), German schlager singer, child star of the late 1970s
Curd Jürgens (1915–1982), German/Austrian actor
Hartmut Jürgens (1955–2017), German mathematician
Hermann Jürgens (1847-1916), German Jesuit priest, Archbishop of Bombay (India)
Jürgen Jürgens (1925-1994), German conductor
Manfred W. Jürgens (born 1956), German painter and photographer
Stefan Jürgens (actor) (born 1963), German actor
Stefan Jürgens (theologian) (born 1968)´, German Roman-Catholic theologian and author
Steffen C. Jürgens (born 1967), German actor and filmmaker
Udo Jürgens (1934–2014), Austrian singer-songwriter
Vera Jürgens (born 1969), Bulgaria-born German player with title of Woman Grandmaster

See also
Jurgens, a list of people with the surname
Jürgen, a list of people with the given name, also Jurgen

German-language surnames

de:Jürgens